Snyder is an unincorporated community in western Chariton County, Missouri, United States. It is located on Missouri Supplemental Route Z, approximately eighteen miles northeast of Carrollton. Snyder's post office has closed, and mail is now delivered from nearby Triplett.

References 
 

Unincorporated communities in Chariton County, Missouri
Unincorporated communities in Missouri